Laxmi Poruri-Madan (born November 9, 1972) is a retired American professional tennis player and the first Indian-American female to play professional tennis on the WTA Tour in the modern era.

Poruri was born in Guntur, India and raised in Central California where, from a very young age, she was known as a tennis prodigy. In 1986, she won the Orange Bowl, beating Monica Seles in the final. At age 15, she played her first US Open where she lost to Katerina Maleeva in the 2nd round. She attended Stanford University from 1990 to 1994 on a full athletic scholarship, where she was a four-time All-American athlete, the 1994 Player of the Year, and the top-ranked women's collegiate tennis player in the country.

After graduating from Stanford, Poruri played professional tennis for several years. Upon retiring from professional tennis, Poruri taught English for a year in Boston, MA. Poruri then attended McGill University in Canada, where she received her MBA.  Poruri worked on Wall Street for two years before returning to California in 2004.

As of 2015, she resides in Austin, TX with her husband, Ajay Madan, a corporate and securities lawyer, and daughter.

References

External links
 
 

1972 births
Living people
American expatriates in Canada 
American female tennis players
American sportspeople of Indian descent
Indian emigrants to the United States
McGill University Faculty of Management alumni
Racket sportspeople from Guntur
Stanford Cardinal women's tennis players
Telugu people
Tennis people from California
Indian-American tennis players
American people of Telugu descent
Sportswomen from Andhra Pradesh